The 2018 Finali Mondiali was the 2018 edition of the season-ending event for all Ferrari Challenge championships. Held at the Autodromo Nazionale Monza in Italy, the event saw drivers from the Asia-Pacific, European and North American championships take part.

The headline Trofeo Pirelli Pro/Pro-Am race was marred by a 14-car crash at the original start, causing a red flag and shortening the race. The eventual Pro-Am winner, Fabienne Wohlwend, made history in becoming the first female winner at a Finali Mondiali – and, on a technicality, the first female World Champion in any four-wheel discipline.

Classification

Trofeo Pirelli

Coppa Shell Pro-Am

Coppa Shell Am

See also
 2018 Ferrari Challenge Europe
 2018 Ferrari Challenge North America

References

Finali 2018
Finali Mondiali
Finali Mondiali